Oulunkylä (also known as Ogeli) is a suburb and a neighbourhood of Helsinki, the capital of Finland.

It has been inhabited since the 13th century. Earlier an independent municipality, it was made part of Helsinki in 1946.

Oulunkylä is also the name of a district. It consists of Patola, Veräjämäki and Veräjälaakso, and has a total area of 4.51 km2.

History

For centuries, Oulunkylä was part of Helsingin pitäjä (now Vantaa). The neighbourhood started to grow after a railway station was founded there in 1881 along the Finland's first railway line between Helsinki and Hämeenlinna. In the late 19th century and early 20th century Oulunkylä was known for many villas that were built there. In 1921 it was separated from Helsingin pitäjä and became an independent municipality. However, most of the Oulunkylä area was already owned by the City of Helsinki and in 1946 Oulunkylä, along with many other suburbs, was annexed by Helsinki.

The modern Oulunkylä is largely constructed according to the zoning scheme of 1953 that transformed the neighbourhood from a villa community into an apartment building suburb.

Sports 
Oulunkylä Ice Rink, a rink used for speed skating and bandy, is located in Oulunkylä. It was the first artificial ice pad for those sports in Finland. The Bandy World Championship has been hosted here.

Bandy
Botnia-69 has Oulunkylä Ice Rink as its home arena.

Ice-hockey 
Oulunkylän Kiekko-Kerho

Soccer 
IF Gnistan

Notable people
 Ville Valo 
 Tapio Rautavaara
 Cynthia Makris
 Raimo Sirkiä 
 Mikko Paananen
 Tito Colliander
 Joel Lehtonen
 Larin-Kyösti 
Friedebert Tuglas 
 Helena Hietanen 
Vladimir Lenin lived here hiding from the Russian police.

References

External links 
 
 http://www.kaupunginosat.net/oulunkyla/ (Finnish)

Former municipalities of Finland
Neighbourhoods of Helsinki